John Dodds (born 13 November 1943) is an Australian former Grand Prix motorcycle road racer. He competed on the Grand Prix circuit from 1966 to 1978. His best finish was a third place behind Dieter Braun and Teuvo Länsivuori in the 1973 250cc world championship.

Motorcycle racing career

During the 1971 season, Dodds helped fellow racer Kim Newcombe develop  a motorcycle using a two-stroke outboard motor designed by Dieter König. Newcombe and the König were the first to challenge the dominance of the MV Agustas after the departure of Honda from Grand Prix competition at the end of the 1967 season. 

Dodds competed in the inaugural Formula 750 European championship in 1973, finishing second at the challenging Clermont-Ferrand circuit, then won the final round at the Montjuïc circuit to finish the season ranked second in the championship behind Barry Sheene. In 1974, he won the preseason invitational 500cc Mettet Grand Prix and then, claimed the 1974 Formula 750 season world championship on a Yamaha TZ 350.

Motorcycle Grand Prix results
Points system from 1950 to 1968:

Points system from 1969 onwards:

(key) (Races in italics indicate fastest lap)

References

1943 births
Living people
Australian motorcycle racers
125cc World Championship riders
250cc World Championship riders
350cc World Championship riders
500cc World Championship riders